Roncador Bank is a mostly-submerged atoll with several sandy cays. It lies in the west Caribbean Sea off the coast of Central America.

Geography 
It is about 15 by 6 kilometers in size, with an area of 65 km2 composed mostly of lagoon. In the northern area lies Roncador Cay.

History 
Originally claimed by the United States under the Guano Islands Act of 1856, the atoll was ceded by the United States to Colombia on September 17, 1981,  as the result of a treaty signed in 1972. 
There are several dilapidated houses on it built by American troops during the Cuban Missile Crisis. 

In 1894, the USS Kearsarge was shipwrecked on Roncador Bank.

Lighthouse 
An old disused lighthouse is at its northern end. A new lighthouse has been operating since 1977.

See also
 List of Guano Island claims

References

External links
 Lighthouse Details
Serrana Bank and Roncador Bank
Photos

Landforms of Colombia
Atolls of Colombia
Caribbean islands claimed under the Guano Islands Act
Former regions and territories of the United States
Islands of the Archipelago of San Andrés, Providencia and Santa Catalina
Former disputed islands